Manihal  is a village in the southern state of Karnataka, India. It is located in the Ramdurg taluk of Belgaum district in Karnataka.

Demographics
 India census, Manihal had a population of 7026 with 3614 males and 3412 females.

See also
 Belgaum
 Districts of Karnataka

References

External links
 http://Belgaum.nic.in/

Villages in Belagavi district